Chopal Assembly constituency is one of the 68 constituencies in the Himachal Pradesh Legislative Assembly of Himachal Pradesh a northern state of India. Chopal is also part of Shimla Lok Sabha constituency.

Members of Legislative Assembly

Election candidate

2022

Election results

2017

See also
 Chopal
 Shimla district
 List of constituencies of Himachal Pradesh Legislative Assembly

References

External links
 

Assembly constituencies of Himachal Pradesh
Shimla district